The former State Administration of Surveying and Mapping, Geographical Names Committee and former Script Reform Committee of the People's Republic of China have adopted several romanizations for Chinese, Mongolian, Tibetan and Uyghur, officially known as pinyin, Regulation of Phonetic Transcription in Hanyu Pinyin Letters of Place Names in Minority Nationality Languages and Orthography of Chinese Personal Name in Hanyu Pinyin Letters. These systems may be referred to as SASM/GNC/SRC transcriptions or SASM/GNC romanizations.

These romanization systems have been used for foreign translations of Chinese personal names and toponyms since 1978.

All schemes except pinyin have a strict form and a broad form, where the broad form is used in general. In the case of pinyin, tone marks are omitted in practice.

Chinese

Hanyu Pinyin is used for the romanization of Chinese; however, the tone marks are omitted in the broad sense and included in the strict sense.

Mongolian

Scheme

Though Mongolian script is listed within the standard, it is still a phonetic transcription based on the Qahar dialect. For example,  is not transcribed as Ûlaganhada hôta but rather Ûlaanhad hôt (strict) or Ulanhad hot (broad).

Though it is recommended within the standard the strict transcription to use the system when transcribing place names and broad transcription is recommended for general use, strict transcription is rarely used in practice, e.g. Hohhot rather than Hohhôt. In certain occasions, the SASM/GNC/SRC romanization of Mongolian is even fused with Hanyu pinyin, such as Huhhot or Huhehot.

Examples

Characters labeled as red in SASM/GNC/SRC strict and Cyrillic Mongolian are not mutually isomorphic. This may be caused by dialectal difference (Chakhar and Khalkha) or different interpretation of the concept phonetical and phonemical. 
Characters labeled as green in SASM/GNC/SRC strict and Traditional Mongolian are not mutually equivalent.

Tibetan

Uyghur

The SASM/GNC/SRC romanization system for the Uyghur language is based on Uyghur New script (commonly known as Yengi Yeziⱪ or Uyghur Pinyin Yëziqi), since at the time it devised Uyghur New script was the official orthography of the Uyghur language in China.

Scheme
 UEY - Uyghur Arabic script (Uyghur Ereb Yëziqi)
 USY - Uyghur Cyrillic alphabet (Uyghur Siril Yëziqi)
 ULY - Uyghur Latin script (Uyghur Latin Yëziqi)
 UYY - Uyghur New script (Uyghur Yëngi Yëziqi)
 broad - SASM/GNC/SRC broad
 strict - SASM/GNC/SRC strict

Non-SASM/GNC/SRC transcriptions and orthographies in China

Pinyin-based or pinyin-influenced
Romanizations such as Bbánlám pìngyīm and Guangdong Romanization, in addition with orthographies such as the Zhuang alphabet (1982) and Yengi Yeziⱪ for Uyghur (Uyghur Pinyin Yëziqi) are not SASM/GNC/SRC transcriptions.

Non-SASM/GNC/SRC transcriptions used in China
Non-SASM/GNC/SRC transliterations may be used in China for scholarly purposes, and are promoted for those circumstances. For example, libraries in China use Wylie transliteration and scientific transcription to transcribe Tibetan and Mongolian book titles respectively within the library catalog.

Non-SASM/GNC/SRC transcriptions (e.g. the THDL), however, are not rather promoted.

Personal and place names from languages without SASM/GNC/SRC romanization
For personal and place names from languages without SASM/GNC/SRC romanization, the pinyin romanization of its transcription into Chinese characters are used. For example, Xishuangbanna is not transcribed as Sipsongpanna or Sibsongbanna.

The Oirat language, however, is transcribed from the corresponding Qahar dialect, since it is considered officially by the PRC government as a dialect of Mongolian.

Notes

References
 Regulation of Phonetic Transcription in Hanyu Pinyin Letters of Place Names in Minority Nationality Languages

External links
 Bureaus
 National Administration of Surveying, Mapping and Geoinformation, formerly State Administration of Surveying and Mapping 
 National Language and Character Working Committee, formerly Script Reform Committee 
 UN
 Chinese - United Nations Romanization Systems for Geographical Names 
 Mongolian - United Nations Romanization Systems for Geographical Names 
 Tibetan - United Nations Romanization Systems for Geographical Names 
 Uighur - United Nations Romanization Systems for Geographical Names 

Romanization